Travel London was a bus company operating services in Greater London. It was a subsidiary of National Express before being sold in May 2009 to NedRailways. In October 2009, it was rebranded as Abellio London.

History
In June 1998, National Express commenced operating routes C1 and 211 under the Travel London brand, using the same symbol and typeface as sister brand Travel West Midlands. In August 2000 National Express sold the business to Limebourne Buses, who in July 2001 sold out to Connex. In February 2004, National Express repurchased the business. Further expansion in 2005 saw the purchases of the London bus operations of Tellings-Golden Miller with a depot in Byfleet and various Surrey County Council contracts.

Travel London operated contracts on behalf of Transport for London, Surrey County Council, and Kingston University. Operations were split between three registered companies; Travel London Limited, Travel London (West) Limited, and Travel London (Middlesex) Limited. The Surrey routes were rebranded as Travel Surrey in September 2007.

In November 2007, National Express announced plans to re-brand all of their operations under a new unified National Express identity. Travel London was to be rebranded as National Express London however this was shelved and all bus operations retained their existing identities.

In May 2009, National Express sold Travel London to NedRailways. The sale included 66 routes, 36 Transport for London tendered services and 30 Surrey County Council and Kingston University routes. All vehicles, depots and staff were included.

On 30 October 2009 the businesses were rebranded as Abellio London and Abellio Surrey.

Travel London Limited

Travel London Limited operated garages at Beddington Cross, Queenstown (Battersea) and Walworth Road, operating 66, 82 and 98 buses respectively (246 in total) when the company was renamed.

Beddington Cross operated London Buses routes 3, 152, 157, 434, G1, P13, and night route N3, and was opened by Connex in 2000 to house their newly won route 3.

Queenstown operated routes 35, 156, 211, 452, C3, 24-hour route 344 and night route N35.

Walworth Road operated routes 40, 100, 129, 188, 343, 381, C1, night routes N343 and N381.

Originally a site acquired by the London County Council for its electric trams, it was known as Camberwell Tram depot until 1950 when its name was changed to Walworth with the arrival of buses. This was to avoid confusion with Camberwell Garage located opposite the Walworth garage. Major rebuilding took place during the 1950s to repair bomb damage from the World War II during which time some buses were worked out of Camberwell.

In the late 1960s the garage assumed operation of the Red Arrow routes with MBAs and later LSs until its closure in 1985. Following the closure of the Victoria and Ash Grove garages, from 1987 Walworth operated the Red Arrow routes for a short time until the Waterloo garage was ready.

During the early 1990s the garage once again re-opened, this time for the Londonlinks operation of routes 78 and 176. The Cowie Group undertook a major restructure a few years later which once again saw closure of Walworth garage in 1997. The garage was owned by the Go-Ahead Group and they leased it out.

The garage lay dormant for the next six years until late 2003 when work started on refurbishing the garage for Travel London, who needed more garage space after some contract wins including routes 381, 452 and N381.

Travel London won the contract for route 407, starting from 31 October 2009. This was used as the launch of the new Abellio name.

Travel London (West) Limited

Travel London (West) Limited operated the garages at Fulwell and Byfleet, the Byfleet depot being rebranded Travel Surrey in September 2007. Respectively, the depots operated approximately 94 and 50 buses (146 in total). Fulwell operated London Buses routes 235, 481, 490, H20, H25, H26, R68 and R70. Byfleet operated Surrey County Council tendered routes 218, 400, 426, 438, 441, 446, 451, 461, 471, 472, 513, 514, 515, 515A, 555, 557, 564, 566, 567, 570, 571, 572, 574, 637, 662, 663 and 690. Fulwell garage also operated Kingston University routes KU1, KU2, and KU3, until the contract was lost to Tellings-Golden Miller in 2009.

Travel London (Middlesex) Limited

Travel London (Middlesex) Limited operated one garage in Hayes. It operated 19 buses on London Buses routes 112, 350, H28 and U7.

References

External links

National Express companies
1998 establishments in England
2009 disestablishments in England